The women's 100 metres hurdles at the 2018 Commonwealth Games, as part of the athletics programme, took place in the Carrara Stadium on 12 and 13 April 2018.

Records
Prior to this competition, the existing world and Games records were as follows:

Schedule
The schedule was as follows:

All times are Australian Eastern Standard Time (UTC+10)

Results

First round
The first round consisted of two heats. The three fastest competitors per heat (plus two fastest losers) advanced to the final.

Heat 1

Heat 2

Final
The medals were determined in the final.

References

Women's 100m hurdles
2018
2018 in women's athletics